Zurlon Tipton (April 27, 1990 – June 28, 2016) was an American football running back. He played college football at Central Michigan and signed with the Indianapolis Colts as an undrafted free agent in 2014.

College career
Tipton played college football at Central Michigan University. During his career, he rushed for 2,463 yards on 461 carries with 34 touchdowns.

Professional career

Indianapolis Colts
Tipton was signed by the Indianapolis Colts after going undrafted in the 2014 NFL Draft. Tipton performed well in the preseason and made the Colts initial 53 man roster, but was waived on September 9, 2014, and re-signed to the practice squad shortly afterward. On November 22, Tipton was promoted to the active roster when Griff Whalen was waived.

After seeing some limited action on special teams, Tipton played running back against the Dallas Cowboys and scored his first NFL touchdown on a 1-yard pass from Matt Hasselbeck.

Tipton saw the first significant game action of his pro football career in the Colts' first game of the 2014 playoffs, supplanting the role of former third-overall Cleveland Browns draft pick Trent Richardson as the second running back behind Dan Herron. He carried the ball 11 times for a total of 40 yards, and also recorded a single reception for six yards. The Colts defeated the visiting Cincinnati Bengals by a score of 26–10 in the game. In the AFC Championship against the New England Patriots, Tipton scored his first NFL rushing touchdown.

On September 5, 2015, Tipton was waived by the Colts, but signed to the practice squad on September 17, 2015. He was signed shortly after to the active roster.

On November 26, 2015, Tipton was again waived by the Colts. He was signed by the Colts again on November 30, and waived again on December 21.

NFL career statistics

Regular season

Postseason

Personal life

Legal history
On December 25, 2015, Tipton was arrested and charged with criminal recklessness with a deadly weapon, after reportedly firing a single shot from his AR-15 rifle into his girlfriend's house. He was released on a $3,000 bond.

Death
On June 28, 2016, Tipton accidentally shot himself in the stomach while removing a bag containing two guns from his car. He was taken to the hospital in good condition but died shortly afterwards.

References

External links
Indianapolis Colts bio

1990 births
2016 deaths
American football running backs
Central Michigan Chippewas football players
Deaths by firearm in Michigan
Firearm accident victims in the United States
Indianapolis Colts players
Players of American football from Detroit
Accidental deaths in Michigan